Saint-Gorgon is the name or part of the name of several communes in France:

Saint-Gorgon, in the Morbihan department
Saint-Gorgon, in the Vosges department
Saint-Gorgon-Main, in the Doubs department